The Nabiti are a Native American tribe from eastern Texas. Their name means "Cedar Place" in the Caddo language.

History
The Nadaco were part of the Hasinai branch of the Caddo Confederacy, although early European explorers identified the Nabiti as enemies of the Hasinai – a testament to the shifting alliances on the South Plains. They lived in settled villages on the banks of the Angelina River.

Spanish priest Fray Casañas wrote about the Nabiti in 1691. He described them as being one of nine Hasinai tribes and that their territory sat between that of the "Cacháe" (Cacachau) and the "Nasayaha" (Nasoni).

Today, Nabiti people are enrolled in the Caddo Nation, headquartered in Binger, Oklahoma.

Synonymy
The Nabiti were also known as the Amediche, Nabiri, Namidish, Naodiche, Naondiche, Naviti, and Nawidish.

Notes

References
 Bolton, Herbet E. The Hasinais: Southern Caddoans As Seen by the Earliest Europeans. Norman: University of Oklahoma Press, 2002. .
 Sturtevant, William C., general editor and Raymond D. Fogelson, volume editor. Handbook of North American Indians: Southeast. Volume 14. Washington DC: Smithsonian Institution, 2004. .

External links
Anadarko tribe, Oklahoma Historical Society
The Nadaco, from Access Genealogy

Caddoan peoples
Native American history of Texas
Native American tribes in Oklahoma
Native American tribes in Texas